Chlorophorus gratiosus is a species of beetle in the family Cerambycidae. It was described by Marseul in 1868.

References

Clytini
Beetles described in 1868